Jáchal Airport was a public use airstrip located  west of San José de Jáchal, San Juan, Argentina.

Google Maps shows the former runway covered with scrub and brush, with washed out areas.

See also

Transport in Argentina
List of airports in Argentina

References

External links 
OpenStreetMap - Jáchal Airport

Defunct airports
Airports in Argentina
Buildings and structures in San Juan Province, Argentina